Šmarješke Toplice is a settlement in the traditional region of Lower Carniola in southeastern Slovenia. It is the seat of the Municipality of Šmarješke Toplice. The municipality is now included in the Southeast Slovenia Statistical Region. The settlement is best known for its spa.

Name
The name of the settlement was changed from Toplice to Šmarješke Toplice in 1953.

Church
The local church in Šmarješke Toplice is dedicated to Saint Stephen and belongs to the nearby Parish of Šmarjeta. It is a medieval building that was restyled in the Baroque style in the 18th century.

References

External links

 Šmarješke Toplice municipal site
 Šmarješke Toplice at Geopedia

Populated places in the Municipality of Šmarješke Toplice
Spa towns in Slovenia